KMLM-DT (channel 42) is a religious television station in Odessa, Texas, United States, serving as the flagship station of God's Learning Channel. Owned by Prime Time Christian Broadcasting, the station maintains studios in Odessa, and its transmitter is located near Gardendale. KMLM also operates satellite station KPCB-DT (channel 17) in Snyder, with transmitter north of the city.

Satellite stations
In addition to KPCB, KMLM operates two other satellite stations, relaying its signal into northwest Texas:

Former repeaters
KMLM was formerly relayed on the following translator stations:
 Abilene - KPTA-LP (63)
 Fort Stockton - K25GO
 McCamey - K50ED
 Monahans - KPDN-LP (27)
 Pecos - K64EC
 Welch - KWGD-LP (54)

References

External links
Official website

Television channels and stations established in 1988
1988 establishments in Texas
MLM-DT
Religious television stations in the United States